Henry Drayton may refer to:

 Henry Lumley Drayton (1869–1950), Canadian lawyer and politician
 Henry Drayton (priest), Canon of Windsor, 1411–1413
 Henry Shipton Drayton (1840–1923), American physician and phrenologist